Dante Agostini (born 18 November 1923) is an Italian sprint canoeist who competed in the early 1950s. He finished 17th in the K-2 10000 m event at the 1952 Summer Olympics in Helsinki.

Agostini was sentenced in absentia to 22 years imprisonment for war crimes whilst he was in Finland.

References

Dante Agostini's profile at Sports Reference.com

External links

1923 births
Canoeists at the 1952 Summer Olympics
Italian male canoeists
Olympic canoeists of Italy
Possibly living people
20th-century Italian people